Table tennis at the 2018 Asian Games was held in Jakarta International Expo Hall B, Jakarta, Indonesia, from 26 August to 1 September 2018.

China dominated the competition winning all possible gold and silver medals.

Schedule

Medalists

Medal table

Participating nations
A total of 179 athletes from 26 nations competed in table tennis at the 2018 Asian Games:

References

External links
Table tennis at the 2018 Asian Games
Official Result Book – Table Tennis

 
2018
2018 Asian Games events
Asian Games
2018 Asian Games